Sahrawi nationalism is a political ideology that seeks self-determination of the Sahrawi people, the indigenous population of Western Sahara. It has historically been represented by the Polisario Front.  It came as a reaction against Spanish colonialist policies imposed from 1958 on, and subsequently in reaction to the Mauritanian and Moroccan invasions of 1975.

Its main opposing ideologies have been Spanish colonialism (Spanish Sahara, 1884–1975), Mauritanian irredentism (Tiris al-Gharbiyya, 1975–1979), Moroccan irredentism (Southern Provinces, 1975-present) and Pan-Arabism.

See also
Sahrawi nationality law
Decolonization of Africa
UN Mission for the Referendum in Western Sahara
Berberism

References